Holdingford is a city in Stearns County, Minnesota, United States. The population was 708 at the 2010 census.  It claims to be "The Gateway to Lake Wobegon", the fictional central Minnesota town created by author Garrison Keillor.

Holdingford is part of the St. Cloud Metropolitan Statistical Area.

History
Holdingford was platted in the 1870s by Randolph Holding on a site near a ford. A post office has been in operation at Holdingford since 1872.

During Prohibition, Holdingford earned the title of "moonshine capital of Minnesota" due to its production of Minnesota 13 whiskey.

Geography

Holdingford is located nine miles north of the city of Avon at Interstate 94 in central Minnesota. The city of Albany is also nearby.

Demographics

2010 census
As of the census of 2010, there were 708 people, 306 households, and 190 families living in the city. The racial makeup of the city was 98.6% White, 0.1% Asian, 0.4% Pacific Islander, and 0.8% from two or more races. Hispanic or Latino of any race were 0.7% of the population.

There were 306 households, of which 29.7% had children under the age of 18 living with them, 44.8% were married couples living together, 9.8% had a female householder with no husband present, 7.5% had a male householder with no wife present, and 37.9% were non-families. 32.4% of all households were made up of individuals, and 14% had someone living alone who was 65 years of age or older. The average household size was 2.31 and the average family size was 2.92.

The median age in the city was 37.3 years. 25.8% of residents were under the age of 18; 7.5% were between the ages of 18 and 24; 25.1% were from 25 to 44; 25.2% were from 45 to 64; and 16.2% were 65 years of age or older. The gender makeup of the city was 50.7% male and 49.3% female.

2000 census
As of the census of 2000, there were 736 people, 286 households, and 197 families living in the city. The racial makeup of the city was 99.18% White, 0.54% Asian, and 0.27% from two or more races. Hispanic or Latino of any race were 0.14% of the population.

There were 286 households, out of which 32.2% had children under the age of 18 living with them, 51.4% were married couples living together, 12.9% had a female householder with no husband present, and 31.1% were non-families. 27.3% of all households were made up of individuals, and 16.8% had someone living alone who was 65 years of age or older.  The average household size was 2.55 and the average family size was 3.13.

In the city, the population was spread out, with 27.6% under the age of 18, 9.8% from 18 to 24, 23.5% from 25 to 44, 20.2% from 45 to 64, and 18.9% who were 65 years of age or older.  The median age was 38 years. For every 100 females, there were 95.7 males.  For every 100 females age 18 and over, there were 91.7 males.

The median income for a household in the city was $34,000, and the median income for a family was $42,788. Males had a median income of $31,053 versus $21,141 for females. The per capita income for the city was $15,410.  About 6.2% of families and 11.2% of the population were below the poverty line, including 13.9% of those under age 18 and 9.2% of those age 65 or over.

Education
Holdingford Public Schools are part of the Holdingford Public School District. Schools in the district include Holdingford Elementary School and Holdingford High School.
Holdingford Elementary serves Preschool to 6th grade, and Holdingford High School serves Grades 7–12. 
The Holdingford Huskers are expanding in the sports area. They have baseball/softball, volleyball, football, tennis, swimming, track, wrestling, and cheerleading.

Infrastructure

Transportation
Stearns County Road 9 (4th Street), Stearns County Road 17 (River Street), and Main Street are three of the main routes in the community.

Holdingford is home to the longest covered bridge in Minnesota. The bridge is located along the Lake Wobegon Trail extension that runs from Albany past Holdingford. Each May since 2008, runners in the Lake Wobegon Trail Marathon start in Holdingford before running 26.2 miles south on the trail to St. Joseph.

Notable people
Kenny Benkowski, better known as "Sodbuster" Kenny Jay, was born March 27, 1937, in Holdingford, Minnesota. He was a professional wrestler who competed primarily in the American Wrestling Association.
Joseph Brinkman, born April 9, 1944, in Little Falls, Minnesota, was raised in Holdingford, and graduated from Holdingford High School. He is a former umpire in Major League Baseball Umpire who worked in the American League from 1973 to 1999 and throughout both major leagues from 2000 until his retirement during the 2006 season.

References

External links
 
  Official City of Holdingford Website
  Holdingford Historical Holdingford Area Historical Society
 Holdingford Public Schools
 City-Data.com
 ePodunk: Profile for Holdingford, Minnesota

Cities in Minnesota
Cities in Stearns County, Minnesota
St. Cloud, Minnesota metropolitan area
Polish-American culture in Minnesota